The Sutter Basin is a  area of the Sacramento Valley in the U.S. state of California, and is part of the Feather River drainage basin. The basin includes the Sutter Basin Fire Protection District of ~ and uses irrigation from the Thermalito Afterbay's Sutter-Butte Canal.  The Feather River and the Sutter By-Pass are the basin's east and southwest borders.

Sutter Bypass

The Sutter Bypass is a leveed channel of the Lower Sacramento Valley Flood-Control System along the southwest portion of the Sutter Basin. During Sacramento River flows of >, Sacramento overflow tops the  Tisdale Weir and flows via the Sutter Bypass to Feather River mile 7 (the west levee of the bypass continues along the Feather River to the Sacramento River).

The bypass also receives similar Sacramento escapement flow from the Colusa Weir, and the Snake River, Gilsizer Slough, Wadsworth Canal, and other west side watercourses of the Lower Feather Watershed also drain to the Feather River via the Sutter Bypass,  The bypass includes  of the Sutter National Wildlife Refuge, which is part of California's ~ Sutter Bypass Wildlife Area.

See also
Feather Headwaters
Yolo Bypass

References

Watersheds of California
Landforms of Sutter County, California